Annunciation is a 1609 work by El Greco, now in a private collection in Madrid. It is a variant on his work on the same theme as part of the Doña María de Aragón Altarpiece. The painter died in April 1614 and the work may have been completed by his son Jorge Manuel after that date. It is not an independent composition but a cut-down fragment of the whole, designed for and installed in the chapel of the Hospital de Tavera.

References

Bibliography (in Spanish) 

 ÁLVAREZ LOPERA, José, El Greco, Madrid, Arlanza, 2005, Biblioteca «Descubrir el Arte», (colección «Grandes maestros»). .
 SCHOLZ-HÄNSEL, Michael, El Greco, Colonia, Taschen, 2003. .
ArteHistoria.com. «Anunciación». [Consulta: 09.01.2011].

El Greco
1609 paintings
Paintings by El Greco